Viktoriia Vladislavovna Meshkova (born 20 September 2000) is a Russian sport climber, specializing in lead, bouldering and combined. She is best known for her three victories at the 2020 European Championships in the events lead, bouldering and combined.
Winning the combined event gave her the right to compete at the 2020 Summer Olympics, where sport climbing will see its debut.

Rankings

Climbing World Championships 
Youth

Climbing European Championships 
Youth

Adult

References

External links 

2000 births
Living people
Female climbers
Russian mountain climbers
Sportspeople from Yekaterinburg
Sport climbers at the 2020 Summer Olympics
21st-century Russian women